Stewart River is a stream in Lake County, in the U.S. state of Minnesota.

Stewart River was named for John Stewart, a pioneer who settled near the river in the 1850s.

See also
List of rivers of Minnesota

References

Rivers of Lake County, Minnesota
Rivers of Minnesota